Žirovnica may refer to:

Municipality:
 Municipality of Žirovnica, a municipality in Slovenia
Settlements:
 Žerovnica, a settlement in the Municipality of Cerknica, Slovenia, formerly also known as Žirovnica
 Žirovnica, Žirovnica, a settlement in the Municipality of Žirovnica, Slovenia
 Žirovnica, Sevnica, a settlement in the Municipality of Sevnica, Slovenia
 Žirovnica, Idrija, a settlement in the Municipality of Idrija, Slovenia
 Žirovnica, Serbia, a settlement in the Municipality of Batočina, Serbia
 Žirovnica, Mavrovo and Rostuša, a village in the Municipality of Mavrovo and Rostuša, Republic of Macedonia
Rivers:
 Žirovnica (river), Idrija
 Žirovnica (river), Žiri